Macednon, a district of ancient Macedonia, near the Pindus mountains. It was the original seat of Macedones.

References

Upper Macedonia